This page gathers the results of elections in Emilia-Romagna.

Regional elections

Latest regional election

In the latest regional election, which took place on 26 January 2020, Stefano Bonaccini (Democratic Party) was re-elected President of Emilia-Romagna, despite a strong challenge posed by Lucia Borgonzoni (Lega Nord Emilia–Romagna).

List of previous regional elections
1970 Emilia-Romagna regional election
1975 Emilia-Romagna regional election
1980 Emilia-Romagna regional election
1985 Emilia-Romagna regional election
1990 Emilia-Romagna regional election
1995 Emilia-Romagna regional election
2000 Emilia-Romagna regional election
2005 Emilia-Romagna regional election
2010 Emilia-Romagna regional election
2014 Emilia-Romagna regional election

 
Politics of Emilia-Romagna